Rise of an Empire could refer to
 The Settlers: Rise of an Empire, a 2007 video game
 300: Rise of an Empire, a 2014 movie
 Young Money: Rise of an Empire, a 2014 music compilation album